The following is a timeline of the history of the city of Limoges, France.

Prior to 20th century

 11 BCE – Settlement renamed "Augustoritum." 
 1st C. CE – Roman Catholic Diocese of Limoges established.
 2nd C. CE –  built.
 4th C. CE - It was again called Lemovices 
 5th C. CE - Devastated by the Vandals and the Visigoths
 848 - Abbey of Saint Martial, Limoges founded.
 1029 & 1031 – Ecclesiastical councils held in Limoges.
 1095 – Pope Urban II held a "Synod of bishops".
 13th C. –  and  built.
 1273 – Limoges Cathedral construction begins.
 1370 – Siege of Limoges.
 1495 – Printing press in operation.
 1525 –  (school) founded.
 1589 – Limoges becomes seat of Limousin province.
 1611 – Catholic "white" and "gray" confraternities of penitents established.
 1615 –  installed.
 1626 – University of Limoges, School of Medicine established.
 1630 – Plague.
 1712 –  created.
 1759 – Société royale d'agriculture de Limoges established.
 1768 –  built.
 1771 – Manufacture of Limoges porcelain begins.
 1790
 Fire.
 Limoges becomes part of the Haute-Vienne souveraineté.
 1791 - Abbey of Saint Martial, Limoges dissolved.
 1793 – Population: 20,864.
 1787 - Royal Limoges A porcelain factory created.
 1806 –  (cemetery) established.
 1838 –  (bridge) built.
 1841 – Population: 29,870.
 1845 –  founded.
 1846 – Population: 38,119.
 1851 – Courrier du Centre newspaper begins publication.
 1858 –  established.
 1861 – Population: 51,053.
 1864 – Fire.(fr)
 1876 – Population: 59,011.
 1883 –  built.
 1886 – Population: 68,477.
 1888 - Limoges Cathedral construction completed.
 1891 – Société des archives historiques du Limousin founded.

20th century

 1905
  take place.
  newspaper begins publication.
 1906 - Population: 75,906.
 1911 – Population: 92,181.
 1929 – Gare de Limoges-Bénédictins rebuilt.
 1933 – Airfield in use.
 1943
 Trolleybus begins operating.
  newspaper begins publication.
 1946 – Population: 107,857.
 1956 – Louis Longequeue becomes mayor.
 1958 – Botanical garden created.
 1968 – University of Limoges established.
 1970
 1970 Tour de France cycling race departs from Limoges.
 Renaissance du vieux Limoges (historic preservation group) founded.
 1972 – Limoges – Bellegarde Airport built.
 1984 –  established.
 1990 – Alain Rodet becomes mayor.
 1998 –  established.
 1999
 TER Limousin train begins operating.
 Population: 133,968.

21st century

 2001 –  established.
 2007 – Limoges Concert Hall opens.
 2012 – Population: 136,221.
 2014
 March:  held.
 Emile-Roger Lombertie becomes mayor.
 2016 – Limoges becomes part of the Nouvelle-Aquitaine region.

See also
 Limoges history
 
 
 
 

Other cities in the Nouvelle-Aquitaine region:
 Timeline of Bordeaux
 Timeline of La Rochelle
 Timeline of Poitiers

References

This article incorporates information from the French Wikipedia.

Bibliography

in English

in French
 
 
 
 
 
  (coverage includes Limoges)
 
  (Table of contents)

External links

 Items related to Limoges, various dates (via Europeana).
 Items related to Limoges, various dates (via Digital Public Library of America).

limoges
Limoges
limoges